"Give It All" is a 2004 song by Rise Against.

Give It All may also refer to:

 "Give It All" (Train song), 2015
 "Give It All", a song by the Amity Affliction from Let the Ocean Take Me
 "Give It All", a song by Don Diablo
 "Give It All", a song by Ratt from Invasion of Your Privacy
 Give It All (film), a 1998 Japanese film

See also
Give It All Away (disambiguation)